For the Winter Olympics, there are three venues starting with the letter 'N', 16 starting with the letter 'O', 14 starting with the letter 'P', none starting with the letter 'Q', and eight starting with the letter 'R'.

N

O

P

Q
There are no venues that start with the letter 'Q'. This includes the 2014 Winter Olympics in Sochi.

R

References